This is a list of places in the United States named for places in Wales.

Bangor 

Bangor, Maine
Bangor, New York
Bangor, Pennsylvania

Cambria 
Cambria Township, Blue Earth County, Minnesota
Cambria Township, Cambria County, Pennsylvania
Cambria, Illinois
Cambria, Indiana
Cambria, Iowa
Cambria, New York
Cambria, Pennsylvania
Cambria, Wisconsin
Northern Cambria, Pennsylvania

Cardiff 
Cardiff, Illinois
Cardiff, Maryland

Monmouth 
Monmouth Junction, New Jersey
Monmouth, Illinois
Monmouth, Indiana
Monmouth, Iowa

Swansea 
Swansea, Arizona
Swansea, California
Swansea, Illinois
Swansea, Massachusetts
Swansea, Nevada
Swansea, South Carolina
Swanzey, New Hampshire
West Swanzey, New Hampshire

Other 

Bala, Kansas
Bala Cynwyd, Pennsylvania (named for two places: Bala, Gwynedd and Cynwyd, Denbighshire)
Brecknock Township, Lancaster County, Pennsylvania
Bryn Mawr, Pennsylvania 
Caernarvon Township, Lancaster County, Pennsylvania
Crum Lynne, Pennsylvania
East Swanzey, New Hampshire
Hawarden, Iowa
Lower Gwynedd Township, Montgomery County, Pennsylvania
Lower Merion Township, Montgomery County, Pennsylvania
Merion, Pennsylvania
Narberth, Pennsylvania
North Pembroke, Massachusetts
North Wales, Pennsylvania
Pembrey, Delaware
Pembroke, Massachusetts
Tredyffrin Township, Chester County, Pennsylvania
Upper Gwynedd Township, Montgomery County, Pennsylvania
Upper Merion Township, Montgomery County, Pennsylvania
Uwchlan Township, Chester County, Pennsylvania

See also
 List of non-US places that have a US place named after them

Welsh origin
Welsh language